Before its current form, the Chaotic Trading Card Game had several names and versions. Starting in Denmark, Dracco Heads was a children's collectors product featuring plastic figurines of strange creatures. In 2000, a trading card game called Grolls & Gorks was published featuring characters and creatures from Dracco Heads. The next year, the game was redesigned by Bryan C. Gannon, and renamed Chaotic: Now or Never! This version of the card game had many characters and cards on which the current version of the Chaotic game and the television series are based.

Dracco Heads
Dracco Heads was a kids' collectors' product sold by Dracco Company Ltd. Dracco Heads featured small plastic figures shaped like heads of strange creatures. A few of these Dracco Heads were given both names and purposes for game play. Dracco Heads were very similar to Crazy Bones.

Over time, Dracco Company Ltd. started making new sets for the Dracco Heads Collection, such as Jumbo Dracco Heads, Baby Dracco Heads, and the Dracco Heads 2nd Edition. The Jumbo Dracco Heads were identical to the originals except for being three times as large, while the Baby Dracco Heads were smaller versions that aimed to be more charming than the originals.

The third Dracco Heads expansion set was called Dracco Heads 2. This set featured 41 entirely new Dracco Heads divided into two factions, the Gorkovi and the Grollovi; in the current Chaotic mythology, these groups would correspond to the Underworlders and the Overworlders. The expansion also introduced the Dracco Stone, which corresponds to the Cothica.

Beyond the lack of Danians and Mipedians, the most significant difference between the current Chaotic mythology and the Dracco Heads 2 mythology is their origin stories. In Dracco Heads 2, the Grollovi's spaceship had crash landed on a planet inhabited by the Gorkovi, and in the process, the ship's cargo, the Dracco Stone, was lost. The Gorkovi, upon finding out about the stone, wanted to find it so that they could use it to rule the universe; the Grollovi, on the other hand, simply needed it to give their spaceship enough power to return to their home planet.

Grolls & Gorks
In 2000 a TCG known as Grolls & Gorks was born. In this trading card game (TCG) the creatures on the cards were mostly from the Dracco Heads 2nd edition, though Location cards were a new addition. Grolls & Gorks was not only a TCG but it was also a Coin Game. It featured plastic coins that had the faces of the Grolls & Gorks creatures on them.

In the Grolls & Gorks TCG, the words GROLLOVI and GORKOVI refer to the creature types.
GROLLOVI are the OverWorlder creatures and GORKOVI are the UnderWorlder creatures.

Chaotic: Now or Never!

In the year 2001 the Grolls & Gorks TCG was turned into Chaotic: Now Or Never! It still featured some of the original creatures from Grolls & Gorks, such as Screamer, TwinHead, Gork, Pingo, Wakko (now known as Yokkis), Clapper (now known as Klasp), and many others. There were also some creatures in the Chaotic: Now Or Never! TCG that came directly from the first edition of Dracco Heads, such as Diablo (now known as Chaor) and Mr. Muscles. Mr. Muscles's name was soon turned into Muxsle, which in 2007 was again changed to Stelgar.

Now or Never! storyline
The story of Chaotic: Now Or Never! is the epic tale of two boys, Tom and Kazdan, and their adventures in Perim, a volatile land where fierce battles are fought trying to capture The Chaos Rock and the control of Perim.

One day, Tom, a smart and curious 12-year-old, finds a pair of rings in his back yard. The rings, Athala and Na'arin (the Ring Of Na'arin is a Battlegear card in the new Chaotic game), are really magical portals to a clandestine realm known as Perim. However, before Tom has the chance to uncover the secret of the rings, the school bully, Kazdan, shows up. Kazdan is a strong 14-year-old boy who is Tom's never-failing rival. Kazdan spots Tom examining one of the rings and manages to steal it from him. Kazdan is unaware of the other ring that is in Tom's backpack. Shortly thereafter, both boys discover that putting on the rings enables them to enter Perim.

Perim is a place of great adventures and epic tales. It is inhabited by five tribes of creatures: the Danians, The Deep Ones, the Mipedians, the OverWorlders, and the UnderWorlders. The OverWorlders and UnderWorlders are constantly warring, while the other tribes keep to themselves and have an air of mystery about them. The OverWorlders are good, kind, innovative and curious. The UnderWorlders are evil, malicious, destructive, and dominating. Tom finds his friends among the OverWorlders while Kazdan finds his with the UnderWorlders.

The two tribes are both interested in peace in Perim, but where the UnderWorlders want peace through supremacy, the OverWorlders want peace through diplomacy. The OverWorlders and the UnderWorlders are of similar strength and size, however individuals in the two tribe vary greatly. To get the upper hand in the struggle between the OverWorld and the UnderWorld, both groups search for the legendary artifact known as the "Chaos Rock". With control of the Chaos Rock, either group could rule Perim. Hence the two groups constantly search and battle for the stone.

The Chaos Rock and the struggle to secure it are the catalysts for endless adventures in the world of Perim. Perim has been built with great level of detail permitting all creatures and locations to have their own integrated story; the land has its legends and the places have their pasts.

Now or Never! cards

The cards in this game are divided into 3 decks for play. The main deck consists of creatures, locations, weapons, spells. This deck is the source of most game play. The second and third decks contain discipline cards and power cards respectively. These decks are used in determining the outcome of battles between opposing creatures.

After 4Kids Entertainment and Bryan C. Gannon signed a contract, the original Chaotic TCG, Chaotic: Now Or Never!, was cancelled and taken off the market.

Now or Never! characters

Tom
Tom is a happy, good natured 12-year-old who is curious and investigative in nature. Tom has enough faith in himself to stand up for what he believes in, but can come across as shy. In Perim, Tom is never shy; he feels respected for what he does and says. Tom is starting to gain confidence in the real world because of his victorious adventures in Perim. Mad Cap and Intress are Tom's best friends. Tom is a friend of the OverWorlders and an enemy of Kazdan, who supports and helps the UnderWorlders in their quest for the ChaosRock.

Kazdan
Kazdan is aggressive, destructive and highly methodical.  He is physically strong, but immature.  Kazdan is unable to understand the damage he does, and, at times, can be downright malicious.  He likes the world he lives in and he likes himself the way he is. Kazdan's best friends are Chaor – the leader of the UnderWorlders, and the young warrior Taki-nom.  Kazdan's enemies are Tom and the OverWorlders, who hate the authoritative approach and despotic rule that Kazdan represents.

Maxxor
Maxxor is the leader of the OverWorlders - he is funny and crazy, yet disciplined, heroic, and intelligent.  Maxxor above all wants peace, but is unfortunately too unfocused to concentrate on that single goal.  He does, however, realize that the other OverWorlders look up to him for his bravery, magical abilities and strength. Maxxor is constantly arranging adventuring parties to go in search of the Cothica.

Intress
Intress is probably the most feminine of the OverWorlders. Her catlike stature and black suit make her an elegant and stealthy ally. Intress' specialty is ranged weapons and she favors protective magic.  On one hand, she is highly charismatic and communicative, but can be secretive and reserved. Her ability to predict and to navigate the opinions and actions of others gives her the upper-hand in critical situations. Her closest ally is MadCap, with whom she forms the perfect team.

Chaor
Methodical and ruthless, Chaor is the perfect leader for the UnderWorlders. He is a despotic ruler, a tyrant with brains and an uncontrollable temper. Chaor is a strong, brave and wise leader who expects loyalty above and appreciates when his UnderWorlders go into harm's way to display bravery and loyalty. Chaor's magical powers – the strongest among UnderWorlders – are based on fire and power and designed to cause maximum harm.

Taki-nom
Taki-nom is an evil UnderWorlder princess with great oriental magic. Taki-nom's greatest asset is her ability to dig up information and she is able to travel both in the UnderWorld and the OverWorld, through blackmail, bribery or intelligence.  She enjoys the respect of other UnderWorlders who fear and admire her ability to influence Chaor's mood.

The original six tribes
The storyline of Chaotic: Now or Never! involved six tribes of Perim, although only five were ever mentioned.

The first tribe was the Mipedians, which consisted of lizard-like creatures that lived in the Overworld deserts. The second was the Danians, which included ant-like creatures that lived in the Underworld's Mount Pillar location.

The third and fourth tribes, the Underworlders and the Overworlders, became the backbone of Chaotic: Now or Never!'''s storyline. The Underworlders were demon-like creatures that lived underground, while the Overworlders lived on the surface and included such varied classes of creatures as wizards, warriors, animals, and alien-esque beings.

The fifth tribe, the Deep Ones, lived in the Deepworld and included aquatic creatures. At some point in Perim's history, they were imprisoned in a location known as the Doors of the Deepmines.  In the modern version of Chaotic, the Deep Ones are known as the M'arrillians.

The sixth tribe, the Frozen, were icy creatures who lived in the Icy Glaciers (known in the modern version of Chaotic as Glacier Plains).

Current Chaotic game
Soon, 4kids Entertainment signed a contract with Apex Marketing, the creators of Chaotic: Now Or Never! and Grolls & Gorks, and brought Chaotic'' to the US. In order to keep the popularity up, they changed the names of some of the creature, location, weapon, and spell cards, as well as the card design, appearance, and card types. Weapon cards are now known as battle gear, and spell cards are now known as mugic.

The story line was also changed for both the game and the TV series. For example, in the original story, Tom and Kazdan were enemies, not friends, and the Cothica was originally known as the Dracco Kamen (meaning "Dracco Stone") and later as the Chaos Rock.

At some point, ChaoticUSA.com was turned into a redirect page for chaoticgame.com and all of the content on the old website was deleted.

Hiatus
After a website update in August 2010, the website stopped updating and the card next set in production was indefinitely delayed. The website still remains however, and while no official announcements have been made, some dedicated fans discovered TCDigital and 4kids had engaged in a series of lawsuits over the Chaotic property.

In spite of this Hiatus, Chaotic still celebrated its 5th anniversary on October 23, 2012, with a staff battle event, and a slight visual change was made to the main website. However, for whatever reason, the announcement on the forums did not effect the "Mega Roar" announcement section of the front page (this has since been fixed).

Closure
4Kids filed bankruptcy in 2014 and reorganized under the name 4Licensing.
4Licensing filed Chapter 11 bankruptcy in 2017.
This dissolved the company and ended the copyright dispute lawsuit with TC Digital.
A reboot of the Chaotic franchise is in progress according to the president of TC Digital Games, Bryan C Gannon.
No details are available on the expected release of the reboot or how different the reboot will be.

References

External links
 Chaotic: Now Or Never! Archived Site
 Chaotic: Now Or Never! Informational Site
 Dracco Heads 2 Official Site
  Grolls & Gorks collector site
 Dracco Website
 Dracco Website
 Dracco Heads Croatian Site
 Dracco Heads 2 Croatian Website

Chaotic Trading Card Game
Collectible card games